The 2012 BH Telecom Indoors was a professional tennis tournament played on hard courts. It was the tenth edition of the tournament which was part of the 2012 ATP Challenger Tour. It took place in Sarajevo, Bosnia and Herzegovina between 12 and 18 March 2012.

ATP entrants

Seeds

 1 Rankings are as of March 5, 2012.

Other entrants
The following players received wildcards into the singles main draw:
  Tomislav Brkic
  Marko Djokovic
  Damir Džumhur
  Aldin Šetkić

The following players received entry from the qualifying draw:
  Nikola Cacic
  Ismar Gorčić
  Evgeny Korolev
  Michał Przysiężny

Champions

Singles

 Jan Hernych def.  Jan Mertl, 6–3, 3–6, 7–6(7–5)

Doubles

 Dustin Brown /  Jonathan Marray def.  Michal Mertiňák /  Igor Zelenay, 7–6(7–2), 2–6, [11–9]

External links
Official Website
ITF Search
ATP official site

BH Telecom Indoors
BH Telecom Indoors
2012 in Bosnia and Herzegovina sport